Just Like Being There is a 2012 documentary film on the American gig poster scene, directed by Scout Shannon.

Content 
Gig posters are a part of the independent music scene. Created specifically for a specific show, the artist tries to capture the music and atmosphere in a print.

The documentary explores the origins of the scene and its current state through interviews with poster artists, the featured bands as well as gallery owners. It explains the technique of poster making and highlights milestone events for the formation of the scene such as the Flatstock poster fair at SXSW and art shows of some of the most renowned gig poster artists. Adjacent fields such as movie posters and art prints are also discussed.

Cast 

The film is mainly driven by interviews with gig poster artists, their subjects, and gallery owners.

 Gig poster artists appearing in the film:
 Jay Ryan
 Daniel Danger
 Tyler Stout
 Aesthetic Apparatus
 Erin Page
 Delicious Design League
 Brian Ewing
 Joanna Wecht
 Boss Construction (Andy Vastagh)
 Doe Eyed
 Dirk Fowler
 Bobby Dixon
 Geoff Peveto
 Furturtle (Travis Bone)
 Dan Grzeca
 Lil Tuffy
 Frida Clements
 Mike King
 Landland
 Ryan Duggan
 Dan MacAdam
 Dan McCarthy
 Dan Stiles
Danny Askar
 Justin Santora
 Jessica Deahl
 Michael Michael Motorcycle
 Rob Jones
 The Bungaloo (Jon Vogl)
 The Small Stakes (Jason Munn)
 Bureau of Print Research & Design (Francisco Ramirez)
 Little Friends Of Printmaking
 Jermaine Rogers
 Sonnenzimmer
 Kathleen Judge
 Strawberryluna
 Kevin Tong
 Tara MacPherson
 Steve Walters
 Jeff Kleinsmith
 Paloma Chavez
 Todd Slater
 Musicians / Bands
 Spoon
 Archers of Loaf
 Hum
 Ted Leo
 Maritime
 Nada Surf
 The Thermals
 Tokyo Police Club 
 Okkervil River
 Other
 Justin Ishmael of Mondo, who employs gig poster artists to create one-off movie posters for screenings at Alamo Drafthouse in Austin Texas
 Mitch Putnam of OMGPosters!
 Laura Stalions, printer at Monolith Press, Oakland CA
 Steve Horvath, printer at DL Screenprinting, Seattle WA
 Andy Stern, printer at Diesel Fuel Prints, Portland OR
 Danny Askar, printer, Los Angeles CA
 Gallery owners
 Kerby Kerr, Rotofugi, Chicago
 Jensen Karp and Katie Cromwell, Gallery 1988, Los Angeles
 Sean Leonard, Cotton Candy Machine, NYC

External links 
 

2012 films
American documentary films
2012 documentary films
2010s English-language films
2010s American films